Hungry Hoboes (alternate spelling: Hungry Hobos) is a silent Oswald the Lucky Rabbit cartoon released by Universal Studios in 1928. It had been lost since before World War II, and was rediscovered in 2011.

Plot summary
Oswald the Lucky Rabbit and Peg Leg Pete are hobos riding on a train carrying cows and chickens. As they play checkers, they are annoyed by Clarabelle (as Bessie) and the cows around them. A chicken appears and they imagine having fried eggs. As Pete prepares a skillet, Oswald unsuccessfully tries to coerce the chicken into laying eggs. Finally he pulls the chicken's head off and extracts two eggs from its body. Since neither hobo has a match, Pete drags Oswald's rear end along the rail until his pants catch fire, then cooks the eggs by holding the skillet over Oswald's burning pants. A policeman notices the two and they run from him, as he pursues them on a bicycle. Pete disguises Oswald as a monkey and, putting a dog, a cat and a pig into a box with a crank on one side, he pretends to be an organ grinder. The deception fails when the animals escape from the box, and the hobos run from the policeman again. They finally escape by jumping onto another train.

Releases
The short was released by Universal Studios in 1928.

It had been lost since before World War II, but was rediscovered in 2011 in the Huntley Film Archives. It was later purchased by the Walt Disney Company for $31,250. It was then restored in a year-long digital process. Hungry Hoboes re-debuted at the Telluride Film Festival, on September 2, 2012, as part of a special animation shorts program presented by leading film historian and restoration expert Serge Bromberg. The restored version was officially released as a bonus feature in the release of the Walt Disney Signature Collection edition of Snow White and the Seven Dwarfs on Blu-ray.

References

External links 
 
 

1928 films
1928 animated films
1928 comedy films
Oswald the Lucky Rabbit cartoons
American black-and-white films
American silent short films
Films directed by Walt Disney
1920s Disney animated short films
Fictional hoboes
1920s rediscovered films
Universal Pictures animated short films
Animated films about animals
Films about bears
1928 short films
Rediscovered American films
Animated films without speech
Films set on trains
1920s American films
Silent American comedy films